Mark Surfas is a Canadian-American game developer and author who founded GameSpy,a gaming media company, online multiplayer platform, and middleware provider He also launched and currently leads multimedia communications company GroupFire and software company Robots and Rockets. He is also the author of the instructional books Running a Perfect Web Site with Windows, Using Intranet HTML, and Creating Your Own ActiveX Web Pages.

Career 
In the early 1990s, Surfas served as director of on-line communications at Coldwell Banker.

Through Que Publishing, Surfas wrote and published the technology books Running a Perfect Web Site with Windows and Using Intranet HTML in 1996. He also published the book Creating Your Own ActiveX Web Pages in 1997. Surfas also founded and organized the Costa Mesa-based gaming event The Beatdown in 1998. He wrote an op-ed concerning video game ratings for the Los Angeles Times in 2000.

Surfas initially formed GameSpy in 1995 as a website called PlanetQuake, which was dedicated to the video game Quake. Surfas licensed the software known as QSpy, which allowed users to list and search for servers for online multiplayer matches of Quake. Initially renaming his service QuakeSpy, he eventually settled on the name GameSpy.

Surfas became chief strategy officer when GameSpy merged with IGN in 2003.

Surfas would also go on to invest in companies such as RealNetworks, Mob Science, OGPlanet, and GeekChicDaily.

As of 2022, Surfas leads GroupFire and Robots and Rockets.

Bibliography 

 Surfas, M. (1996). Running a Perfect Web Site with Windows: United States: Que Publishing.
 Surfas, M. (1996). Using Intranet HTML. United States: Que Publishing.
 Surfas, M. (1997). Creating Your Own ActiveX Web Pages. United States: Que Publishing.

References 

Canadian game designers
21st-century Canadian male writers
Living people
Year of birth missing (living people)